On the Other Side may refer to:

 On the Other Side (film), a 2016 Croatian-Serbian film directed by Zrinko Ogresta
 On the Other Side, a 1983 album by Alan Hull
 On the Other Side, the 2005 version of the album Carry On by Kansas
 "On the Other Side", a 2009 song by Delain from April Rain
 "On the Other Side", a 1979 song by Kansas from Monolith
 "On the Other Side", a 1967 song by the Seekers from Seekers Seen in Green